The Tiszaeszlár Affair was originally a murder case which was represented in journals as a blood libel that led to a trial that set off anti-semitic agitation in Austria-Hungary in 1882 and 1883. After the disappearance of a local girl, Eszter Solymosi, Jews were accused of murdering and beheading her. A body was found some time later in a river, she having apparently drowned, but the Hungarian Highest Court (Kúria) found that the body was not that of Eszter, but had been dressed in her clothes.  A lengthy trial followed, eventually resulting in the acquittal of all the accused.

Origin of the accusation

On April 1, 1882, Eszter Solymosi, a 14-year-old Christian peasant girl who was a servant in the home of András Huri in Tiszaeszlár, a Hungarian village situated on the Tisza river, was sent on an errand from which she did not return. After a fruitless search, a rumor was circulated that the girl had become a victim of Jewish religious fanaticism. 

The origin of the rumours was the son of József Scharf who said that the same thing was happening in those times in Russia: a Christian girl disappears and everybody blames the Jews.

Hungarian agitators, whose leaders, Géza Ónody, representative of Tiszaeszlár in the Hungarian Parliament, and Győző Istóczy, MP, proposed the expulsion of the Jews in the House of Deputies, excited the public against the local Jews, resulting in a number of violent acts and pogroms. They spread the charge that the Jews killed the girl in order to use her blood at the approaching Passover (April 4). On May 4 her mother accused the Jews before the local judge of having murdered her daughter, and urged him to make an investigation.

"Confessions" of the Scharf children 

On May 19 the county court of Nyíregyháza sent the notary József Bary to act as examining judge at Tiszaeszlár. After having placed the suspected Jews under police surveillance, Bary met the five-year-old son of the synagogue sexton József Scharf, Samuel, to begin an inquiry. In Bary's interview, the boy stated that in the presence of his father and other men the slaughterer had made an incision in the girl's neck, and he and his brother Móric had received the blood in a plate. The father and Móric (who was nearly 14 years old) and the other suspected persons denied any knowledge of the disappearance of the girl and of her conjectured murder. On May 19 Scharf and his wife were arrested; Móric repeated his statement and said in addition he had not known anything about the missing girl, not even from hearsay. On the evening of that day Móric was given to Recsky, the commissar of safety, who took him to his country house in Tiszanagyfalu, where the court clerk, Péczely, received orders to watch over the boy's safety. 

The boy confessed that after the Sabbath morning service his father called Eszter to his house under the pretext of requiring her to remove some candlesticks (an act forbidden to Jews on Saturdays); that a Jewish beggar, Hermann Wollner, who lodged with them, had led the girl to the vestibule of the synagogue and attacked her; and, after having undressed her, two slaughterers, Ábrahám Buxbaum and Leopold Braun, had held her while another slaughterer, Salamon Schwarz, incised her neck with a large knife and emptied the blood into a pot. These three men, applicants for the vacant position of preceptor and shoḥeṭ, came to Tiszaeszlár to officiate on that particular Sabbath, and had, as the boy said, remained in the synagogue after morning service. All this, according to his confession, Móric observed through the keyhole of the synagogue door. During the 45 minutes he thus stood on watch, he saw after the operation a rag was tied around the neck of the girl and her body dressed again, in the presence of Sámuel Lustig, Ábrahám Braun, Lázár Weisstein, and Adolf Jünger. The two conspirators Recsky and Péczely immediately sent for the examining judge Bary, before whom the same night Móric repeated his account, adding that after the perpetrators left the scene of their crime he had locked the synagogue, and that neither the corpse nor any blood marks were to be found. With feverish zeal Bary continued his investigations in the synagogue and houses and among the graves; but nowhere could any traces of the living or dead girl be discovered. Twelve Jews were arrested on suspicion, and Móric Scharf was given in charge of the jailer.

On June 18 a body that the district physician declared to be of a 14-year-old girl was drawn out of the river Tisza near the village Dada. Her mother denied it was Eszter's corpse, although she afterward identified the clothes in which the body was found as those of her daughter. A committee of experts, two physicians and one surgeon, declared the corpse was of a girl 18 to 20 years of age who had met with her death eight or ten days before. It was then buried in the Catholic cemetery of Tiszaeszlár. The anti-Semitic agitators, among whom was the Catholic priest of the town, insinuated the body was smuggled in by the Jews and clothed in the garments of Eszter Solymosi in order to conceal the crime of ritual murder. Several of the craftsmen who found the body were induced by promises, threats, and cruel treatment to revoke their former testimony and to declare they brought the body to the river and an unknown Jewess had furnished them with the clothes in which they dressed it.

Making of formal accusations 

On July 29 formal accusations were made against fifteen persons, as follows: Salamon Schwarz, Ábrahám Buxbaum, Leopold Braun, and Hermann Wollner, of murder; József Scharf, Adolf Jünger, Ábrahám Braun, Sámuel Lustig, Lázár Weisstein, and Emánuel Taub, of voluntary assistance in the crime; Anselm Vogel, Jankel Smilovics, David Hersko, Martin Gross, and Ignác Klein, of abetting the crime and smuggling the body. By order of the government, Móric Scharf was under the control of the district bailiff, who placed him in the custody of the warden Henter, and thus removed from contact with the other defendants and other Jews. 

The accused were defended by Károly Eötvös, journalist and member of the House of Deputies, with whom were associated the advocates B. Friedmann, Sándor Funták, Max Székely of Budapest, and Ignác Heumann of Nyíregyháza, the seat of the county court before which the case was tried. In a petition to Minister of Justice Pauler, Eötvös protested against the system of torture practised by Bary, Recsky, and Péczely, but this protest had little effect upon the official. The affair was so long drawn out that State Attorney Kozma of Budapest went to Nyíregyháza in September to speed up the examination.

Protest by Lajos Kossuth 

This dragging on of the proceedings attracted general attention. The country was greatly agitated. A number of pamphlets appealed to the passions of the people, and attempted to establish the guilt of the accused. Lajos Kossuth, then living in exile at Turin, raised his powerful voice to castigate the action of the authorities and to deprecate this stirring up of anti-Jewish prejudices. The suspicion of ritual murder, he considered, was a disgrace to Hungary; to present as a racial crime or as a ritual crime a murder which at the worst was an individual one was, he said, unworthy of modern civilization. This cry of indignation from the veteran patriot was strangely in contrast with the fury of persecution and prejudice which raged throughout the country and which was echoed in the House of Deputies. An interpellation addressed to the minister of justice by the deputy Ernő Mezei in November 1882, called forth exciting scenes. The attorney-general Havas was then sent to Nyíregyháza, and he found that, despite the official declaration of the examining judge, the accused had not had a single hearing. He released some prisoners; but, realizing he was hampered by powerful influences in his endeavor to accelerate the affair, he offered his resignation, which was readily accepted.

Eszter's corpse exhumed 

In the middle of November the wife of József Scharf was set free, and disappeared for a few days, while her husband and the other prisoners were being still detained. At the request of the defending lawyers the body found in the Tisza was exhumed (December 7) and reexamined by three professors of medicine at the University of Budapest – Schenthauer, Belky, and Mihalkovics. They found that the opinion of the members of the former committee of examination had no scientific basis, and later, before the court, they taxed them with gross ignorance: the body was too much decayed to allow a positive judgment. The fact the corpse was not claimed by any one left no doubt in their opinion, however, that it was that of Eszter Solymosi; and as the neck was not cut, no ritual murder could have been committed. However, the Highest Court of Hungary (Kúria) did not accept the identification.

On June 17, 1883, the last act in this affair began before the court of Nyíregyháza. Judge Ferenc Korniss presided, Eduard Szeyffert acting as state attorney. Although the testimony of Móric Scharf was the only basis of the accusation, the court held thirty sessions to examine the case in all its details, and many witnesses were heard. The glaring contradictions of the boy despite the careful training he received, and the falsity of his accusation as exposed by a local inspection of the alleged scene of the murder made by the court in Tiszaeszlár on July 16, resulted in the unanimous acquittal of the accused (August 3). Szalay, the attorney for the widow Solymosi, in a speech full of bitter invectives, appealed against the decision; but the supreme court rejected his appeal and confirmed the verdict of the county court.

The youthful accuser, Móric Scharf had to go into exile to Amsterdam.

Acquittal of the accused 
The acquittal and release of the prisoners, most of whom had languished in prison for 15 months, were the signal for uprisings in Pozsony, Budapest, and other parts of Hungary, except for Tiszaeszlár. The spectators who thronged the court-house during the sessions, and of whom Onody, the representative of Tiszaeszlár in the House of Deputies, was the most conspicuous, conducted themselves scandalously during the proceedings, insulting the prisoners and threatening the witnesses and counsel for the defence.

21st century repercussions

According to Tablet magazine, the Jobbik Party uses the case to incite antisemitism and the child's grave has become the site of antisemitic pilgrimage.

Scientific reconstruction of the events

In 2017, professor of international law, László Blutman in his book, The Mysterious Tiszaeszlár Trial  tried to reconstruct the events and the long lost records of the trial and found that there are many possible explanations of what had happened, but none of them can be underpinned with a 100% certainty. According to him, the least implausible version of the events is that Eszter was asked by József Scharf to put the candles out in the synagogue, because the arrival of Sabbath forbids Jews to do activities which can be considered as work. In the synagogue maybe by accident, maybe because she ridiculed the Jewish habits and therefore got hit by Scharf who was infamous for his quickness of temper, Eszter fell off from a ladder or a chair, and hit her head. Then the frightened Scharf let blood of Eszter, which was a medical practice in those time, which was seen by his son. After the failed resuscitation, the local Jews - fearing from pogroms which were widespread in Russia and in Central Europe- hid the corpse, and dressed another one to make it look like she committed suicide. The Hungarian Highest Court however ruled out that the corpse was that of Eszter.

See also
Blood libel against Jews
The Austrian 1948 film Der Prozeß which was based on these events.
Arnold Zweig's 1915 surrealist tragedy Ritualmord in Ungarn is based on these events.
 The YIVO Encyclopedia of Jews in Eastern Europe Hillel J. Kieval: Tiszaeszlár Blood Libel
The novel "Dance with a dead maid" by Slovak author Juraj Bindzár

References

Sources
 Allg. Zeit. des Jud. 1882–83, 1884, p. 248;
 Die Neuzeit, 1882–83;
 Der Blutprozess von Tisza Eszlar in Ungarn: Vorgeschichte der Auflage und vollständiger Bericht über die Prozess-Verhandlungen vor dem Gerichte in Nyiregyháza. New York:  Schnitzer Brothers, 1883;
 Paul Nathan, Der Prozess von Tisza-Eszlar, Berlin, 1892.S. S. Man.
 Eötvös Károly: A nagy per, Budapest, 1904.
 Krúdy Gyula: A tiszaeszlári Solymosi Eszter, Budapest, 1975. (2nd ed.)

 

1882 in Hungary
1883 in Hungary
1882 crimes in Europe
1883 crimes in Europe
Blood libel
Jewish Hungarian history
Antisemitism in Hungary
Hungary under Habsburg rule